Grizzly Peak is a mountain in Jackson County, Oregon, overlooking the city of Ashland and the Bear Creek Valley. It has an elevation of 5,922 feet, and is located largely on Bureau of Land Management land.  A trail exists to the summit.

See also
 Grizzly Peak Winery

References

External links
 

Cascade Range
Mountains of Jackson County, Oregon
Mountains of Oregon